Amata janenschi is a moth of the family Erebidae. It was described by Seitz in 1926. It is found in Tanzania.

References

 Natural History Museum Lepidoptera generic names catalog

Endemic fauna of Tanzania
Janen
Moths of Africa
Moths described in 1926